Ivar Theodor Böhling (10 September 1889 – 12 January 1929) was a Finnish wrestler who competed in the 1912 Summer Olympics.

He won the silver medal in the light heavyweight class. In a remarkable final, he wrestled for nine hours against the other finalist, the Swedish wrestler Anders Ahlgren, before it was declared a draw. The judges refused to award a gold medal, stating that the champion had to have won the final match. Thus they both were given second place and no gold medal was awarded.

Böhling won the 1914 Unofficial European title in the light-heavyweight division, and four national titles: two in light-heavyweight (1911 and 1913) and two in heavyweight (1915 and 1916). He then turned professional, and retired in 1920.

References

External links

 

1889 births
1929 deaths
Wrestlers at the 1912 Summer Olympics
Finnish male sport wrestlers
Olympic wrestlers of Finland
Olympic silver medalists for Finland
Olympic medalists in wrestling
Medalists at the 1912 Summer Olympics